Tabaqah or Tabqa may refer to:
 Tabqa Dam, a dam on the Euphrates River
 At Tabqah, now known as Al-Thawrah, a city in Syria near the Tabqa Dam
 At-Tabaqa, a Palestinian village near Hebron
 Tabaqa, Jordan, an archeological site; see Natufian culture
 Tabaqah, Libya, a town in western Libya
 Tabaqah, Oman, a settlement in Oman

See also
 Tabgha, an area situated on the north-western shore of the Sea of Galilee in Israel